Kurortne is an urban-type settlement in the Feodosia Municipality of Crimea. Population:

References

External links
 

Feodosia Municipality
Urban-type settlements in Crimea